The England team were unhappy with the umpiring in the 1946–47 Ashes series, in particular when Don Bradman was not given out when caught by Jack Ikin for 28 in the First Test and 22 in the Second (Bradman went on to make 187 and 234). Test cricket was not filmed except for highlights and the notion of Test umpires using slow-motion replays or other modern techniques would have been considered absurd. Instead the umpires had to make judgements based on what they saw in a split-second, and honest mistakes were accepted as part and parcel of the game. However, touring teams sometimes felt that there was a natural bias towards the home team which led to some acrimony if important decisions always went against them. The Australian Ray Robinson wrote in The Cricketer:

Usually debatable decisions work out fairly evenly over a Test rubber, but weight of evidence suggests that the umpires were mistaken in giving Bradman not out caught for 28 in the First Test, Edrich out leg-before-wicket for 89 in the Third Test, and Washbrook out caught behind the wicket for 39 in the Fourth Test. These decisions came at such points in England's bids to gain an advantage that they could almost be termed turning-points of the three games.

The Umpires
Umpiring is a thankless sort of task. it is unspectacular, its financial rewards are not great, and it calls for unwavering concentration during hours of standing, sometimes under a pitless sun, sometimes in a biting wind. To this must be added the fact that decisions like stumpings, run-outs, l.b.w.s and catches at the wicket are frequently the cause of contention, with the umpire invariably coming in for adverse criticism.
Keith Miller
The 1946–47 Ashes series was the first in Australia for ten years because of the Second World War. Only two umpires were used in the five Tests as there had been no opportunity for new umpires to come to the fore. They were George Borwick, who had been an umpire in the infamous Bodyline series of 1932-33 and John Scott, famous in Australia for cracking down on the same hostile fast bowling he used to serve up as a young man in the Sheffield Shield. They had been umpires in the "Goodwill Tour" of 1936-37 when there had been no problems and had the confidence of both teams. After the First Test the England captain Wally Hammond and his manager Major Rupert Howard tactfully suggested that other umpires might be added to the panel, but this proposal was rejected by the Australian Board of Control which included the Australian captain Don Bradman. It may simply have been the case that the ABC had no other umpire that it could use. Hammond had been asked by the MCC to promote sportsmanship and avoid disruption even at the cost of the series and therefore had limited options. He could have taken his concerns to the MCC so that they could make representations with greater authority or gone to the press to raise a public outcry and so force the ABC's hand, but he did neither. Even so, the English press corps in Australia (and some Australian journalists like Clif Cary) queried the competence of the umpires (their honesty was never questioned). As Australia won the first two Tests this was seen as 'squealing' by the Australia newspapers who were supported by journalists back in London who said that umpiring decisions must never be questioned. The furore was enough for Umpire Scott to resign after the Fifth Test, he told his critics that they had "pilloried and lampooned him for doing his duty fearlessly...I gave no decision I regret, nor did I feel afterwards that I would have liked to have withdrawn any decision I made". Umpire Borwick made a statement that he thought Ray Lindwall did not bowl bumpers in the series - contradicting Lindwall, who said he was ordered to bowl them by Bradman - and retired after the Indian tour of Australia in 1947-48.

Catches and Stumpings
Bradman had only made 28, when he played Bill Voce into the slips. Jack Ikin caught the ball and threw it high in the air in joy. He had caught the great Bradman, and Australia, he thought, were three down for under a hundred on a good wicket. That was how it looked to Ikin, to some of the other English players and some of the crowd, and that was how it looked to me sitting watching from the dressing room. Bradman, however, thought it was a bump ball and he stayed, as he was fully entitled to do if there was any doubt in his mind...the umpire gave him not out and he went on to make 187 of Australia's total of 645.
Keith Miller

The most contentious decision of the series was when Don Bradman was not given out when he was on 28 in the First Test. Bradman was returning to bat after the war and a serious illness had struggled for an hour even on a good batting strip. Australia were 72/2 when Bill Voce bowled a ball that "flew from the blade of the bat to Ikin".  Clif Cary was watching Bradman with Zeiss glasses while commentating on the radio and reported "The next ball from Voce rises as it goes away and Bradman is out...Bradman out, caught Ikin at second slip, bowled by Voce, for 28". Ikin made the mistake of not appealing immediately as it was assumed that a batsman will walk when he is so obviously out, but "Bradman stood there as if he had never hit the ball" "The fieldsmen stared as Bradman stood his ground, then appealed for a catch. In believing that he had jammed the ball on to the ground before it rose, Don was in a minority of the nearest witnesses on the field but that minority included the umpire". As one player said afterwards "cricket is coming to a pretty pass if a side has to appeal for everything; when that happens it will mean the end of all those things for which cricket is supposed to stand".

Cary wrote "there was not doubt of the legality of the catch", Jack Fingleton called it "one of the most unfortunate decisions in the history of the Tests." and most English pressmen shared their view. However, E.W. Swanton reported "The Don waited for the decision, confident that it was a bump ball, and the umpire Borwick, ruled 'not out'". In the Australian dressing rooms the players were divided as to whether he was out or not. When Bradman returned at the end of the session he said he had played down on a yorker and to Ray Lindwall there was no doubt as to his sincerity. In the end the batsman was given the benefit of the doubt, but it had repercussions. Bradman recovered his form and hit 159 runs in 160 minutes before he was out for 187, which set up Australia's victory in the First Test by an innings and 332 runs. This was a morale-booster for a young team with eight debutants, but if Bradman had been out the Australian total would have been less, England would have batted on a flat wicket and the thunderstorm that wrecked the wicket would have caught Australia in their second innings. 'As he walked past Bradman at the end of the over Hammond glared at Bradman and said tensely, "That's a fine way to start a Test series"'. The England captain was furious that Bradman had not walked in what was supposed to be a post-war goodwill tour and refused to talk to him for the rest of the series except to call the toss. To the press he was more diplomatic "I thought it was a catch but the umpire may have been right and I may have been wrong" Bradman, 38 years old and suffering from fibrositis, had been advised not to play by his doctor and a cheap dismissal might have made him retire, especially if he had been caught on a sticky wicket in the second innings. Keith Miller later wrote "that decision was subsequently admitted in nearly every quarter to have been erroneous".

A similar incident occurred in the Second Test, though it might not have been seen as a problem if it had not followed the events of the first. Bradman was on 22 when he appeared to snick another catch to Ikin at short leg, but "this time there may have been some cause for doubt; it was an appeal that could have gone either way". Bradman was given not out and made 234, so in his first two innings he made 421 runs, but if he had he been given out he would have made only 50. In the Fourth Test at Adelaide Cyril Washbrook was given out to Ray Lindwall to a ball that Don Tallon scooped off the ground. Washbrook "stood there transfixed. Even some of the Australian leg-side fielders expressed amazement". Tallon was known for his impetuous appealing - "he was often roaring before he had studied facts and it was his over-eagerness that brought about the shocking decision" - and Bradman asked him if he still wanted to appeal. Tallon said he did and Bradman stood by the decision. It was later suggested that Tallon told Bradman that it was not a clean catch and Clif Cary thought if Bradman had gone into the matter further he would have recalled Washbrook as had happened in other such cases. The Australian reporter Ray Robinson wrote "I believe nearby fieldsmen were impetuous in appealing as the wicket-keeper scooped up the ball, and that the hesitant umpire would have been wiser to have asked his square-leg colleague whether it carried to the gloves or was gathered on the half-volley". Hammond tried to locate a press photograph of the ball touching the ground to show the ABC, who demanded proof of the incompetence of the umpires before they were willing to change them, but no photo was found.

The only complaint from the Australian side about the umpiring was that Ray Lindwall thought Denis Compton should have been stumped in both innings of the Fourth Test before he reached either of his centuries. In the first innings the glare from the sun (it was 105°F/40°C) was so bright that the white paint of the crease could not be seen clearly, and the same may have applied in the second innings, but little fuss was made of this.

Bad Light
<blockquote>
We could have played on, but it was a Test match and we just had to win. I realised something drastic had to be done or three wickets might be lost. So I appealed after every second ball. I complained of the people moving about, the light, and, in fact, anything, in an effort to get the appeal upheld.
Sid Barnes
</blockquote>

After tea on the second day of the Second Test at Sydney Australia were 24/1 after Arthur Morris was bowled by Bill Edrich on a wet wicket suited to the England bowling attack. "On a stormy Saturday Barnes and Johnson angered the crowd by making made 8 appeals against the light in 11 minutes...This stalling saved Australia losing more than Morris's wicket and the granting of the last appeal enabled Bradman to rest a strained leg for Monday". The umpires gave in to the constant appealing and the batsmen were allowed to retire an hour before stumps.Wisden - ENGLAND v AUSTRALIA 1946-47 Clif Cary opined in his radio commentary that the light was bright enough to play by and the umpires had been pressured into a decision by the Australian batsmen, as did the English pressmen. They were labelled "biased, unsportsmanlike squealers" and that Barnes and his captain Bradman would never use such underhand tactics. When the batsmen returned next day Barnes survived the early bad wicket and went on the make 234, his highest Test score, adding 405 with Bradman in what still is the highest Test partnership in Australia. Bradman had received permission from Hammond to use a substitute fielder earlier in the day because of a pulled leg muscle and as a result did not have to come out to bat on a wet wicket. He was able to rest on the Sunday and when play resumed on the Monday he lowered himself down the batting order and came out in the afternoon, when "He limped as if in extreme pain, and several times lay on the ground as if ill", On the Tuesday he gave "an amazing exhibition in amassing 234 runs - that is, amazing for one who was supposed to be a cripple. He played all the shots, pulled leg muscle and all, and often ran between the wickets with the speed of an Olympic sprinter". After the series ended Barnes gave a radio interview and freely admitted that he had "kept on appealing until the umpires answered me" simply because he thought the wicket was bad.

In the Third Test Barnes appealed for light at the end of the second day, which was rejected, but he saw out the day with Morris. In the final half hour of the Test Norman Yardley and Godfrey Evans batted on when Australia wanted three wickets for their third victory of the series "even though the light was atrocious and rain was falling heavily". Hammond had been dismissed earlier, but refused to let his team appeal against the light, either to make a point about the Barnes appeal or simply due to sportsmanship. Bill O'Reilly said "I could not understand why the English batsman seemed loath to appeal against the weather, even when the rain was coming down solidly. There are no praises for gallant gestures in Tests matches". In the Fifth Test the new England captain Norman Yardley appealed  against the light in a low scoring match where every run was vital. He had his appeal turned down and he and Jack Ikin lost their wickets in light so bad that the Australian cameramen were unable to take clear photographs. They were carrying light meters (not available to umpires for nearly 40 years) and stated that the light was much worse than when Barnes and Johnson were allowed off the field.

LBW
On at least four occasions he was convinced he had Bradman in his bag but it was not to be. Wright, I believe was very keen to secure such a verdict over Bradman, who only once has been dismissed l.b.w. during his Anglo-Australian Test career, and that was in his maiden game when Tate found him in front. This is a Bradman record of which no mention is made on the statistical pages, but it reveals not only he marvellous eye, but also his splendid footwork... 
Clif Cary

Leg before wicket decisions are notoriously difficult to judge and only the umpire is in the correct position to judge the line of the ball and its height when its hits the batsmen. The lbw laws of the time meant that a batsman could not be lbw to a ball that pitched outside the off-stump unless he was also outside the off-stump. Though this was meant to encourage off-side strokeplay and prevent batsmen from padding away balls it resulted in batsmen padding-up to off-side balls while in front of the wicket and encouraged inswing bowlers such as Alec Bedser who normally hit the batsmen in front of the leg-stump.

In the Third Test at Melbourne Bill Edrich was given out lbw to Ray Lindwall by Umpire Scott after he hit the ball onto his pads with his bat. The bowler wrote "Bill genuinely thought he hit the ball onto his pad...I saw no deviation of the ball after it pitched and I heard no click". A few minutes later he gave Denis Compton out lbw to Ernie Toshack when padding up of a ball that landed outside the stumps, causing the Middlesex player to stare at him in disbelief before his walked off. Lindwall wrote that Compton "made no stroke at a ball he thought had pitched outside his leg-stump, but which umpire and bowler declared pitched on the line of the leg stump", which would make Compton out. Wally Hammond came on and, annoyed at the two dismissals, gave a simple caught-and-bowled to Bruce Dooland. Cyril Washbrook was out soon after and England collapsed from 155/1 to 179/5. Scott was angry with the English pressmen who accused him of making the wrong decisions, saying Edrich had not hit the ball with his bat and Washbrook had thought Compton was out (though Washbrook was several yards to the right of the umpire and so unable to judge the line of the ball).

Conversely the England leg-spinner Doug Wright was considered to be the unluckiest bowler in the world;p63, Swanton "He continually rapped the pads with his straight one, and when the decision went against him, his face clouded with puzzled dismay." In the Third Test he caught Bradman with a straight ball that he to hit to leg, but missed and the ball hit him on the top of his pads plumb in front of the stumps. Wright and Evans appealed, but Bradman was given not out. However, a cameraman took a series of photographs of the delivery and "the camera appears to give a different verdict".

No Balls
Lindwall's drag of his right foot has often brought him under the fire of those who claimed that he was over the line before he released the ball...As a matter of fact Ray's right foot is well behind the crease when he starts to bring his arm over, but he releases the ball later in his swing than any other bowler I have seen.
Johnnie Moyes

In modern cricket the bowler is no-balled if he bowls without some part of the front foot (either grounded or raised) behind the popping crease when it lands (it is still a legal ball if it slides over the line) and if his back foot is not wholly inside the return crease. In the 1940s the front foot rule had not been written, so the requirement was that one foot be behind the bowling crease and fast bowlers tended to drag the toe of their rear foot over the bowling crease to decrease the distance between them and the batsmen when they released the ball. If they timed it well the delivery was made when the toe was still behind the crease, but they could drag it over the line and they would be no-balled. This proved to be a particular problem in the 1950s. As you can see on this old cine film of Ray Lindwall dragging his foot over the bowling crease. See Film on Youtube. It should have been called as a no-ball as his rear foot was past the crease when he delivered the ball, easy to see in a slow motion replay, but difficult for the umpire. Lindwall's action was a text book model, but he was known for his heavy drag. Alan Kippax said that he watched Lindwall for 45 minutes in the Fourth Test at Adelaide without once seeing him bowl a legal delivery and sometimes his foot dragged 18 inches over the crease. However, the fast bowler was only called for no-balling twice in the series, which Clif Cary thought was a disservice to Lindwall as the English umpires would call him in 1948 if he did not correct his action in time (this proved not to be a problem). Lindwall himself wrote that if the no-ball law was enforced strictly almost every bowler would be no-balled and “the spirit of the law demanded that the bowler should land behind the bowling crease and as long as I did that I was playing the game”.  The New South Wales Cricket Association asked him to bowl a yard back from his present delivery, but Bill O'Reilly advised him not to change until no-balled by an umpire and as a result Lindwall kept his action unchanged.

This was the opposite of what happened to the English leg-spinner Doug Wright, a notorious no-baller with a "long, springy run and windmill action" that saw him overstep the line too many times. Bill O'Reilly wrote "He waves his arms widely, and rocks on his legs like a small ship pitching and tossing in a fairly heavy sea. Whenever he bowls in Australia there are people who whistle and cat-call as he goes through his strange approach to the stumps." Jack Fingleton called the no-ball "Wright's curse...He's probably bowled more of these than any other spinner in history",<ref>p67, Jack Fingleton, Brown and Company, The Tour of Australia, Collins, 1951</ref> It was easier for the umpires to call Wright for no-balling as be bowled at a slow-medium pace and Lindwall's fast bowling was more difficult to judge, but they should have called them equally if their feet were over the line. Incidentally, Wright had a habit of licking his hand before bowling each ball which the umpires forbade in the 1950-51 Ashes series and upset his rhythm, but was allowed by Scott and Bowick in 1946-47.

Hostile Bowling
I must say when I bowled at Len I felt a sense of personal grudge I have never known against any other batsman.  Ray did too. I suppose Len suffered a greater barrage from the two of us than any other player in the world. We both put in that little bit extra against Len, and he had to take it time after time...he had a poker face and never expressed either elation or disappointment. I tried my wickedest bumpers, hoping that I would have the satisfaction of seeing him look scared.
Keith Miller

After the Bodyline series of 1932-33 hostile fast bowling was discouraged in Australia. In 1936-37 Umpires Scott and Borwick even gave the two teams a lecture on short pitched bowling. In the Goodwill Tour Gubby Allen, Bill Voce and Ernie McCormick bowled to a good length and the batsmen enjoyed making runs. After Len Hutton's 364 at the Oval in 1938 the Australian team reckoned fast bowling should return to normal as they thought Hutton had a weakness against fast bowling. Jack Fingleton reckoned he would have received a warm reception on the next tour of Australia. When Test cricket resumed with the 1946–47 Ashes series Australia found that they had two quality fast bowlers in Ray Lindwall and Keith Miller and since England only had the medium pace of Alec Bedser and an aging Bill Voce they could bowl as many bouncers as they liked without fear of retaliation. Their particular target was Hutton, who was given an "opening blitz" at the start of the innings, but Hammond and Edrich also suffered.

In the First Test Keith Miller dug the ball in short and "nearly every ball from Lindwall rose head high". “Edrich batted for 105 minutes. He suffered more than 40 body blows with a nonchalant contempt for danger and seemed content to be battered black and blue rather than lose his wicket. It was grim concentration and unflinching courage of the type rarely seen in Australia, and he was undaunted even after a terrific sickener under the ribs from Miller". Lindwall wrote that Hammond and Edrich "were hit on the body repeatedly". Miller used a limited leg-trap some of the time, but he quickly slowed his pace as on the rain-affected pitch the ball leapt so much that it could hit the batsman, but not get them out. One English pressman wrote that this was Bodyline, to the anger of Vic Richardson, Alan Kippax and Clarrie Grimmett who had seen the real thing. Clif Cary wrote that "the placements were sufficient to cause the batsmen worry, although they did not justify one journalist describing the attack as "bodyline" to lend colour and expression to his cable". The England bowler Bill Voce and the reporter Bill Bowes did not comment on the matter, but Harold Larwood said that Bodyline was less dangerous as the batsman knew what to expect - bouncers on the leg-stump - but here they could get anything.

After the Ashes had been retained Fingleton wrote that it would be sporting if the Fast bowlers stopped bouncing Hutton, whose left arm had been badly broken in the war - it had required 46 stitches to repair his arm, which was left two inches (5 cm) shorter and another injury could end his career. It was also thought unsportsmanlike to bowl them at Paul Gibb who wore glasses. It was noted that though Bradman did not tell Lindwall and Miller to stop bowling bouncers in general as a good captain he did not allow them to bowl short at Cyril Washbrook. As well as being a resolute batsman Washbrook had a weakness for cutting the ball outside the off-stump, so that is where Bradman directed his bowlers and he received fewer short balls as a result. Denis Compton and Norman Yardley had weaknesses against the spinners, so Bradman would bring on Ian Johnson and Colin McCool to bowl to them. "So it was that bumpers were not wanted. They were generally kept for those who had a real hatred for them, while a few additional slammers were indiscriminately thrown in for good measure against all and sundry".

Further reading
 Playfair Cricket Annual 1947
 Wisden Cricketers' Almanack 1948
 
 Ashley Brown, The Pictorial History of Cricket, Bison Books, 1988
 Bill Frindall, The Wisden Book of Test Cricket 1877-1978, Wisden, 1979
 David Frith, Pageant of Cricket, The MacMillan Company of Australia, 1987
 David Frith, England Versus Australia: An Illustrated History of Every Test Match Since 1877, Viking, 2007
 Ray Robinson, On Top Down Under, Cassell, 1975
 Bob Willis and Patrick Murphy, Starting with Grace, Stanley Paul, 1986

References

Sources
 Clif Cary, Cricket Controversy, Test matches in Australia 1946-47, T. Werner Laurie Ltd, 1948
 Ray Lindwall, Flying Stumps, Marlin Books, 1954
 Keith Miller, Cricket Crossfire, Oldbourne Press, 1956
 A.G. Moyes, A Century of Cricketers, Angus and Robertson, 1950
 Ray Robinson and Mike Coward, England vs Australia 1932-1985, in E.W. Swanton (ed), The Barclays World of Cricket, Collins, 1986
 E.W. Swanton, Swanton in Australia with MCC 1946–1975, Fontana/Collins, 1975

1946 in Australian cricket
1946 in English cricket
1947 in Australian cricket
1947 in English cricket
1946
Cricket umpiring